Thomas Ernest Forsyth was a Scottish amateur football inside forward who played in the Scottish League for Queen's Park and Airdrieonians.

Personal life 
As of 1911, Forsyth was a law student. He served as a lieutenant in the Royal Field Artillery during the First World War.

Career statistics

References

1892 births
Scottish footballers
Scottish Football League players
British Army personnel of World War I
Royal Field Artillery officers
Association football inside forwards
Queen's Park F.C. players
Date of death missing
Footballers from Airdrie, North Lanarkshire
Airdrieonians F.C. (1878) players